The list of churches in Bjørgvin is a list of the Church of Norway churches in the Diocese of Bjørgvin which includes all of Vestland county in Norway. The list is divided into several sections, one for each deanery (headed by a provost) in the diocese. Administratively within each deanery, the churches are divided by municipalities each of which has their own church council and then into parishes which have their own councils. Each parish may have one or more local church.

Historically, the diocese has had many deaneries, but the number of deaneries has been reduced in recent years. The Laksevåg deanery (created in 1990) in Bergen was dissolved in 2013 and its churches were divided between the Bergen domprosti and the Fana prosti. Also in 2013, the old Ytre Sogn prosti was dissolved.  The old deanery included Gulen, Solund, Hyllestad, Høyanger, Balestrand, and Vik municipalities.  The municipalities of Gulen and Solund were transferred to the Nordhordland prosti, which includes the northern municipalities in the old Hordaland county.  Hyllestad and Høyanger were transferred to Sunnfjord prosti, and Balestrand and Vik were transferred to Indre Sogn prosti and it was renamed Sogn deanery.

In 2014, the Midhordland prosti was dissolved and its churches were divided between Fana prosti and Hardanger og Voss prosti.  Also in 2014, the parishes in nearby Osterøy Municipality were transferred from Nordhordland prosti to the Arna og Åsane prosti. At that time, its name could have been changed to "Arna, Åsane and Osterøy deanery" but that was considered to be too long a name. In 2015, the Norwegian Department of Culture changed the name to Åsane prosti.

In 2017, the diocese created a new deanery called Bergensdalen prosti to help relieve the work in the large deaneries in the city of Bergen.

Bergen domprosti 
This arch-deanery covers the central part of the city of Bergen.  The deanery is headquartered at the Bergen Cathedral in the city of Bergen in Bergen Municipality. In 1990, the domprosti was split into four deaneries: Arna og Åsane prosti in the northeast, Fana prosti in the south part of the city, Laksevåg prosti in the west part of the city, and Bergen domprosti in the city centre. In 2013, parts of the old Laksevåg prosti (which was dissolved) were moved back into this deanery.

Nordfjord prosti 
This deanery covers several municipalities in northern part of the diocese. The deanery is headquartered at Eid Church in the village of Nordfjordeid in Stad Municipality.

Sunnfjord prosti 
This deanery covers several municipalities in the north-central part of the diocese.  The deanery is headquartered at Førde Church in the town of Førde in Sunnfjord Municipality. In 2013, the churches in Hyllestad and Høyanger were transferred to this deanery when Ytre Sogn prosti was split up.

Sogn prosti 
This deanery covers several municipalities in east-central part of the county. The deanery is headquartered at Stedje Church in the village of Sogndalsfjøra in Sogndal Municipality. In 2013, the old Ytre Sogn prosti (outer Sogn) was dissolved and the churches in Balestrand and Vik municipalities were transferred to this deanery.  At the same time, this deanery's name was changed from Indre Sogn prosti (inner Sogn) to simply Sogn prosti.

Nordhordland prosti 
This deanery covers several municipalities in west-central part of the county.  The deanery is headquartered at Alversund Church hain the village of Isdalstø in Alver Municipality. The churches in the municipalities of Gulen and Solund in the old Sogn og Fjordane county were moved into this deanery in 2013 when the old Ytre Sogn prosti in Sogn og Fjordane county was dissolved. In 2014, the churches in Osterøy Municipality were transferred from here to the neighboring Arna og Åsane prosti.

Åsane prosti 
This deanery covers the northern/eastern part of the city of Bergen and the neighboring municipality of Osterøy in the central part the county. The deanery is headquartered at Åsane Church in the borough of Åsane in the city of Bergen. The deanery was created in 1990 when it was split off from the Bergen domprosti. Originally it was named Arna og Åsane prosti. In 2014, the churches from Osterøy Municipality were transferred to this deanery from Nordhordland prosti deanery. After that, the name of the deanery was shortend to simply Åsane prosti.

Bergensdalen prosti 
This deanery covers the south-central part os the city of Bergen. This deanery was created in 2017 when parts of the Bergen domprosti and Fana prosti were split off to create this new deanery.

Fana prosti 
This deanery covers the southern part of the city of Bergen and the neighboring municipalities of Bjørnafjorden and Austevoll in the west-central part of the county.  The deanery is headquartered at Fana Church in the borough of Fana in the city of Bergen.

The deanery was established in 1990 when it was split off from the old Midhordland prosti. In 2013, the old Laksevåg prosti was split up and the Fyllingsdalen and Sælen parishes were transferred to Fana prosti. In 2014, the old Midhordland prosti was dissolved and split up and the parishes in the municipalities of Os and Austevoll were transferred to Fana. In 2017, the churches from Fusa Municipality were transferred here from the neighboring Hardanger og Voss prosti.

Hardanger og Voss prosti 
This deanery covers several municipalities in the southeastern part of the diocese. The deanery is headquartered at Voss Church in the village of Vossevangen in Voss Municipality. The municipalities of Fusa and Samnanger were moved to this deanery when the old Midhordland prosti was dissolved in 2014. In 2017, the churches in Fusa were transferred to the neighboring Fana prosti.

Vesthordland prosti 
This deanery covers the two island municipalities of Askøy and Øygarden in the west-central part of the diocese.  The deanery is headquartered at Fjell Church in the village of Straume in Øygarden Municipality.

Sunnhordland prosti 
This deanery covers several municipalities in the southwestern part of the diocese.  The deanery is headquartered  at Stord Church in the town of Leirvik in Stord Municipality.

References

 
Bjorgvin